The Illinois Department of Labor (IDOL) is the code department of the Illinois state government that is responsible for the administration and enforcement of more than 20 labor and safety laws. Its director is Michael Kleinik, who was appointed in by Governor J.B. Pritzker.

Beginning in 2015, it will also be responsible for enforcing the Job Opportunities For Qualified Applicants Act, which prohibits employers from inquiring into, considering, or requiring the disclosure of a job applicant's criminal history or background on a job application.

See also

 Illinois Department of Employment Security

References

External links
 Illinois Department of Labor
 TITLE 56: LABOR AND EMPLOYMENT of the Illinois Administrative Code

Labor
State departments of labor of the United States
Labor relations in Illinois